This is a list of neighborhoods in the New York City borough of Manhattan arranged geographically from the north of the island to the south.

The following approximate definitions are used:

Upper Manhattan is the area above 96th Street.
Midtown Manhattan is the area between 34th Street and 59th Street.
Lower Manhattan is the area below 14th Street.
West Side is the area west of Fifth Avenue; East Side is the area east of Fifth Avenue.

Neighborhood names and boundaries are not officially defined. They may vary or change from time to time due to demographic and economic variables.

Uptown neighborhoods

Midtown neighborhoods

Between Midtown and Lower Manhattan

†Large scale developments

Lower Manhattan neighborhoods

†Large scale developments

Islands
 Ellis Island
 Governors Island
 Liberty Island
 Randalls and Wards Islands
 Roosevelt Island

See also
 Neighborhoods in New York City
 List of Bronx neighborhoods
 List of Brooklyn neighborhoods
 List of Queens neighborhoods
 List of Staten Island neighborhoods
 Tin Pan Alley (Location)

References

External links

Neighborhood map from NYC Department of City Planning

 
Manhattan
Manhattan
Manhattan